Morosaphycita morosalis is a moth of the family Pyralidae. It lives throughout Eastern Africa from Egypt to South Africa, including the Indian Ocean islands and in India and Nepal.

The larvae is considered a pest to Jatropha curcas, a species in the family Euphorbiaceae, eating its flowers and young fruits.

References 

Moths described in 1880
Phycitinae
Moths of Africa
Moths of Asia
Moths of Madagascar
Moths of Réunion